Charles William John Withers,  (born 6 December 1954) is a British historical geographer and academic. He has been the Geographer Royal for Scotland since 2015, and held the Ogilvie Chair of Geography at the University of Edinburgh from 1994 to 2019.

Early life and education 
Withers was born on 6 December 1954. He was educated at Daniel Stewart's College, an all-boys private school in Edinburgh. He studied at the University of St Andrews (BSc), and Downing College, Cambridge (PhD).

Academic career
Withers joined the University of Edinburgh as Professor of Historical Geography in 1994. He was Head of its Institute of Geography from 2006 to 2009, and held the Ogilvie Chair of Geography from 2010 to 2019.

In September 2015, Withers was appointed Geographer Royal for Scotland: the first such appointment since 1897.

Professional affiliations 
Fellow of the British Academy
Fellow of the Royal Geographical Society
Fellow of the Royal Historical Society
Fellow of the Royal Society of Arts
Fellow of the Royal Society of Edinburgh
Member of the Academia Europaea
Chartered Geographer
Member of the Academy of Learned Societies for the Social Sciences

Books 
Placing the Enlightenment: thinking geographically about the Age of Reason (University of Chicago Press, 2007).
Geography and revolution, edited with David N. Livingstone (University of Chicago Press, 2005).
Georgian geographies: essays on space, place and landscape in the eighteenth century, edited with Miles Ogborn (Manchester University Press, 2004).
Science and medicine in the Scottish Enlightenment, edited with Paul Wood (Tuckwell Press, 2002).
Geography, science and national identity: Scotland since 1520 (Cambridge University Press, 2001).
Geography and Enlightenment edited with David N. Livingstone (University of Chicago Press, 1999).
Urban Highlanders: Highland-Lowland migration and urban Gaelic culture, 1700-1900 (Tuckwell Press, 1998).
Urbanising Britain: essays on class and community in nineteenth-century Britain, edited with Gerry Kearns (Cambridge University Press, 1991).
Discovering the Cotswolds (John Donald, 1990).
Gaelic Scotland: the transformation of a culture region (Routledge, 1988).
The Highland Communities of Dundee and Perth 1797-1891: a study in the social history of migrant Highlanders (Abertay Historical Society Publication, 1986).
Gaelic in Scotland 1698 to 1891: the geographical history of a language (John Donald, 1984).

References

External links 
 Homepage

1954 births
Living people
Academics from Edinburgh
People educated at Stewart's Melville College
Fellows of the British Academy
Fellows of the Royal Geographical Society
Fellows of the Royal Society of Edinburgh
Scottish geographers
Scottish linguists
Scottish scholars and academics
Fellows of the Academy of Social Sciences
Academics of the University of Edinburgh
Alumni of the University of St Andrews
Alumni of Downing College, Cambridge
Members of Academia Europaea
Fellows of the Royal Historical Society
Historical geographers
20th-century Scottish educators
21st-century Scottish educators
Recipients of the Royal Geographical Society Founder's Medal
Fellows of the Royal Scottish Geographical Society